B.M.S. Institute of Technology (Autonomous) is a private engineering college in Yelahanka, Bangalore, India. It was started in 1946 by Bhusanayana Mukundadas Sreenivasaiah and is run by the B.M.S. Educational Trust. It is affiliated with Visvesvaraya Technological University and became autonomous in 2020. BMSIT is located on Dodballapura Road, Yelahanka, diagonally opposite to the Halli saviruchi (ಹಳ್ಳಿ ಸವಿರುಚಿ). Though a private college, it is partially funded by the Government of Karnataka.

History
BMSET was founded in 1946 with three undergraduate courses namely mechanical, Computer Science, and electrical engineering B. M. Sreenivasaiah was followed by his son B. S. Narayan.

Academic Profile
 
It was founded by B S Narayana, son of educationist B M Sreenivasaiah, and is managed by the B M S Educational Trust. It is the sister institution of B M S College of Engineering, a well established government aided engineering college in India. B.M.S. Institute of Technology is recognized as a research centre by Visvesvaraya Technological University. And Autonomous in 2020  Initially, starting out with Eight disciplines of engineering,  And Four Disciplines of Masters Degree. The college was granted the status of a Research Institution by the Visvesvaraya Technological University in 2005.

Undergraduate
These departments offer four-year undergraduate courses in engineering. All of the undergraduate courses have been conferred autonomous status by the Visvesvaraya Technological University. The following programmes are offered: Civil Engineering. Computer Science, Electronics and Communication Engineering, Electrical And Electronics Engineering, Information Science, Artificial intelligence and Machine learning, Mechanical Engineering and Electronics and Telecommunication Engineering. The allied departments of the college are the departments of Physics, Chemistry, Mathematics, Humanities along with the placement and training department.

Post Graduate 
BMS Institute of Technology offers several courses. All the courses are Affiliated under the  Autonomous scheme Master of Computer Applications (M.C.A.) and Master of Technology (M.Tech.) and
Master of Business Administration (MBA) degree..

Undergraduate Admissions
Undergraduate 
Students are admitted to undergraduate courses on basis of their performance in either Karnataka Common Entrance Test , or in the COMED-K test. There is a lateral entry scheme in place, by which students holding diploma degrees can enter directly to the second year of study in engineering. Students, upon graduating, receive a Bachelor of Engineering degree.

Post Graduate Admission
Students are admitted to postgraduate courses on basis of their GATE test scores, as well as on their Post Graduate Karnataka CET scores.Students, upon graduating, receive a Master of Computer Applications (M.C.A.) or Master of Technology (M.Tech.) degree. They also offer an Master of Business Administration (MBA) degree..

Events

Utsaha vaibhava techno cultural fest organized by BMS Yelahanka in the commencement of even semester

Tech Transfer is a technical event organised by BMSIT in the odd semester

Rankings 

B.M.S. Institute of Technology and Management was ranked 199 by the National Institutional Ranking Framework (NIRF) engineering ranking in 2022.

References

Engineering colleges in Bangalore
All India Council for Technical Education
Affiliates of Visvesvaraya Technological University